Zeaxanthinibacter enoshimensis is a Gram-negative strictly aerobic and rod-shaped bacterium from the genus of Zeaxanthinibacter which has been isolated from seawater from Enoshima. Zeaxanthinibacter enoshimensis produces zeaxanthin.

References

Flavobacteria
Bacteria described in 2007